Bulolo District is a district of the Morobe Province of Papua New Guinea.  Its capital is Bulolo.  The population of the district was 101,568 at the 2011 census. Since 19 July 2012 the district has been represented in parliament by Sam Basil.

References

Districts of Papua New Guinea
Morobe Province